Goriška Gora is a small settlement in the Municipality of Škocjan in historical region of Lower Carniola in southeastern Slovenia. Within the municipality, it belongs to the Village Community of Zagrad. The municipality is now included in the Southeast Slovenia Statistical Region.

References

External links
Goriška Gora at Geopedia

Populated places in the Municipality of Škocjan